Everett Duane "Eppie" Barnes (December 1, 1900 – November 17, 1980) was an American baseball and basketball player. He played as an infielder for the Pittsburgh Pirates during the 1923 and 1924 baseball seasons. He is a member of the Colgate Athletics Hall of Honor, the United Savings-Helms Athletic Foundation Hall of Fame, the American Association of Baseball Coaches, and a 1966 inductee to the College Baseball Hall of Fame.

From 1928 to 1936, he was the regular first baseman for the semipro Brooklyn Bushwicks baseball team. In 1930, he was a pitcher for the Sunrise Trails, and in 1939 played briefly with the Springfield Greys.

Barnes also participated in basketball for pay in the Central New York and Long Island areas. He played for the Utica Knights of Columbus and the Syracuse Alhambras during the 1922–23 seasons and played with the Rockville Centre Firemen during the 1932–33 season. Barnes, born in Ossining, New York, was a graduate of Erasmus Hall High School and Colgate University.

References

External links
 Baseball-Reference player page
 Colgate Hall of Honor page

1900 births
1980 deaths
Colgate Raiders athletic directors
Colgate Raiders baseball coaches
Colgate Raiders baseball players
Colgate Raiders men's basketball players
Pittsburgh Pirates players
People from Ossining, New York
Baseball players from New York (state)
Basketball players from New York (state)
Erasmus Hall High School alumni
American men's basketball players